Epioblasma is a genus of freshwater mussels, aquatic bivalve mollusks in the family Unionidae, the river mussels. Most of the species in this genus have been lost in modern times, and the entire genus is threatened with the possibility of extinction.

Reproduction
All Unionidae are known to use the gills, fins, or skin of a host fish for nutrients during the larval glochidia stage. It was discovered in 2004 that female Epioblasma in the subgenus Torulosa transfer their parasitic larvae to the host fish by snapping onto the head of the fish and pumping the larvae into the host fish's gills. While using bait to lure host fish towards the larvae is common in the family Unionidae, this was the first time that "fish snapping" behavior had been observed. Examination of other species within the genus Epioblasma may further reveal unusual reproductive mechanisms.

Taxonomy of the genus Epioblasma
Note: Taxa with a "†" symbol are extinct due to human activity
Subgenus †Epioblasma
†Epioblasma flexuosa - Leafshell
†Epioblasma lewisii - Forkshell
†Epioblasma stewardsonii - Cumberland leafshell 
Subgenus Pilea
†Epioblasma haysiana - Acornshell
Epioblasma obliquata
Epioblasma obliquata obliquata - Purple catspaw
Epioblasma obliquata perobliqua - White catspaw
†Epioblasma personata - Round combshell
Subgenus Plagiola
†Epioblasma arcaeformis - Sugarspoon
Epioblasma brevidens - Cumberlandian combshell
†Epioblasma lenior - Narrow catspaw 
Epioblasma metastriata - Upland combshell
Epioblasma othcaloogensis - Southern acornshell
Epioblasma penita - Southern combshell
Subgenus Torulosa
Epioblasma ahlstedti - Duck River oyster mussel 
†Epioblasma biemarginata - Angled riffleshell
Epioblasma capsaeformis - Oyster mussel
†Epioblasma cincinnatiensis - Cincinnati Riffleshell 
Epioblasma florentina
Epioblasma florentina aureola - Golden riffleshell
Epioblasma florentina curtisii - Curtis pearlymussel 
†Epioblasma florentina florentina - Yellow blossom
Epioblasma florentina walkeri - Tan riffleshell
†Epioblasma propinqua - Tennessee riffleshell
†Epioblasma sampsonii - Wabash riffleshell
Epioblasma torulosa
†Epioblasma torulosa gubernaculum - Green blossom 
Epioblasma torulosa rangiana - Northern riffleshell
†Epioblasma torulosa torulosa - Tubercled blossom
†Epioblasma turgidula - Turgid riffle shell
Subgenus Truncillopsis
Epioblasma triquetra - Snuffbox

Conservation status

This entire genus is imperiled. In this genus, 15 species or subspecies are believed to be extinct. Of those remaining, all are federally protected species. The last to be listed as a federally endangered species was Epioblasma triquetra, which was listed in 2012. 

This group of freshwater mussels is threatened primarily by habitat alteration as are other freshwater mussels. Dams, erosion, and pollution appear to be the primarily threats.  Some workers recognize additional species not currently on the official list of recognized species.

Gallery

References

 
Bivalve genera
Taxa named by Constantine Samuel Rafinesque
Taxonomy articles created by Polbot